Wasterkingen is a municipality in the district of Bülach in the canton of Zürich in Switzerland.

History

In 2002, Wasterkingen had his 900th birthday, the Wasterkingener celebrated a big party and there were a lot of interesting attractions to learn more about the history of this little village.

Geography
Of this area, 46.4% is used for agricultural purposes, while 43.4% is forested. The rest of the land, (10.2%) is settled.

Wasterkingen has a road border crossing into Germany. Günzgen in the state of Baden-Württemberg lies just across the border.

Demographics
, 7.7% of the population was made up of foreign nationals. Over the last 10 years the population has grown at a rate of 3.7%. Most of the population speaks German  (98.0%), with French being second most common ( 0.7%) and English being third ( 0.5%).

In the 2007 election the most popular party was the SVP which received 53.8% of the vote.  The next three most popular parties were the SPS (17.3%), the Green Party (10.3%) and the CSP (6.2%).

The age distribution of the population is children and teenagers (0–19 years old) make up 28.6% of the population, while adults (20–64 years old) make up 60.4% and seniors (over 64 years old) make up 11.1%.  In Wasterkingen about 91.8% of the population (between age 25–64) have completed either non-mandatory upper secondary education or additional higher education (either university or a Fachhochschule).

Wasterkingen has an unemployment rate of 1.25%.  , there were 31 people employed in the primary economic sector and about 11 businesses involved in this sector.  4 people are employed in the secondary sector and there are 3 businesses in this sector.  21 people are employed in the tertiary sector, with 7 businesses in this sector.

References

External links

 Official website 

Municipalities of the canton of Zürich
Germany–Switzerland border crossings